Ken Fraser (born 17 February 1940) is a former Australian rules footballer in the (then) Victorian Football League (VFL).

Originally recruited from the Essendon Baptists St John's club (which has since merged with Ascot Vale Presbyterians to become the Tullamarine Football Club) in the Essendon District Football League, Fraser mainly played at centre half-forward. He won the Essendon Football Club's Best First-Year Player award in 1958 and went on to play in two premiership teams, with the second premiership as captain. He also won two club best-and-fairest awards and represented Victoria on many occasions. In 2001, Fraser was inducted into the Australian Football Hall of Fame. In 2002, he was ranked 7th in the Champions of Essendon list.

Fraser was also Principal of Templestowe Secondary College in Lower Templestowe, Victoria, Australia, for many years. His son, Mark, also played for Essendon.

Footnotes

References 
 "New Boys" join the 200 club, The Age, (Tuesday, 3 December 1968), p.25.

External links

Essendon Football Club players
Essendon Football Club Premiership players
Champions of Essendon
Yarrawonga Football Club players
Australian Football Hall of Fame inductees
Crichton Medal winners
1940 births
Living people
Australian rules footballers from Victoria (Australia)
Two-time VFL/AFL Premiership players